Watervale is a town on the Horrocks Highway in the Clare Valley, South Australia, approximately 9 kilometres north of Auburn and 15 kilometres south of Clare. It is surrounded by a number of small wineries and several B&Bs. The Riesling Trail runs past the town to the west, between the Highway and the Skilly Hills. The town has a number of 19th-century heritage buildings, including the former Stanley Grammar School, which now provides private bed and breakfast accommodation.

History
Watervale is located on Eyre Creek, which is a tributary of the Wakefield River. The area on which the town was settled was originally granted to a pioneer named David Davies in 1847 by Governor Robe, and he named this section of land Watervale.

The area was settled by a number of Protestant families who founded a Bible Methodist Church in the township. The current Uniting Church and accompanying hall are examples of such colonial constructions in the area.

The second vineyard in the Clare Valley was planted by Valentine Mayr, who planted four acres at 'Pomona', Watervale in 1852, and made his first wine in 1856. He had thirty acres planted with shiraz and verdelho, which is now the site of Crabtree Watervale Wines, located on Main North Road north of Watervale.

The heritage listed Quelltaler Estate dates back to 1865. Francis Treloar, formerly a miner at Burra, bought 117 acres of land near Watervale in 1851, for a winery which he named Spring Vale. Treloar established the Springvale wine cellars in 1868: sections of these stone cellars, dug into the hillside (as was typical of cellars at that time) survive. 
In 1890 T. G. H. Buring and Carl Sobels joined forces and purchased the Spring Vale vineyard and plant. This winery subsequently was developed as Quelltaler, known more recently, as Annie's Lane. In 2017 this winery and vineyards were bought by Seppeltsfield.

Hughes Park Estate, extending over 3,000 hectares, is three km from Watervale in the Skilly valley, where the first stone homestead was completed in 1860. It was built by Sir Walter Watson Hughes, who owned the Walleroo and Moonta copper mines and founded Adelaide University from his profits. Still owned by the Duncan family, over the years many Watervale residents have found work there. At present the restored two-story homestead caters for weddings and the restored 1845 worker's cottages are now rented as a B&B.

The town today
The township boasts a general store and Post Office, Hotel, Primary School, CFS unit, Anglican and Uniting churches, a garage, a small number of local businesses, wineries, and a variety of recreational facilities at the "Watervale Soldiers' Memorial Park" (tennis club, tennis courts and a bowling green). Several Bed and Breakfast and Holiday Cottages are available for rent, including Watervale Retreat, Battunga B&B, Quince Cottage. The town can be readily accessed from the Riesling Trail. The historic Grandstand overlooking the town oval was renovated in 2010.

As part of the Clare Valley, the area is known for Riesling. Cabernet and Shiraz wines are also produced. Local wineries include Crabtree Watervale Wines, Stephen John Wines and Annie's Lane.

A local artist of note is Harry Sherwin.

Watervale hosts an annual 'Day on the Green' concert at Annie's Lane, attracting up to 6,000 concert-goers.

The Watervale Foresters Hall, which in more recent years had been used by the community for meetings, art classes and a children's playgroup, had by 2009 fallen into disrepair. It was subsequently sold by the Watervale Community Association following considerable controversy and is now in private ownership.

Governance
Watervale is in the District Council of Clare and Gilbert Valleys, the state electoral district of Frome, and the Australian House of Representatives Division of Grey.

See also
 Stanley Football Association

References

Towns in South Australia
Mid North (South Australia)